Association football is among the most popular team sports in Pakistan, Football in Pakistan has historically been among the top sports in Pakistan, together with long time number one cricket and hockey Pakistan's current top domestic football league is the Pakistan Premiere League, formed with sixteen clubs to promote football in the Pakistan. The semi-professional league began in 2003 and was immediately recognised by the AFC as the official national football league, running parallel with the Pakistan Football Federation League, the 2nd division of Pakistani Football. Football in general is ran by the Pakistan Football Federation.

History

Origins
The origin of football in Pakistan can be traced back to mid-nineteenth century when the game was introduced by British soldiers in British India. Initially, games were played between army teams. However, clubs were soon set up around the country. Kohat FC was the first club to be established in 1930, it became the first outstation team to win the North-West India Football Championship 1937 in 1937 defeating Government College Lahore 1–0 in the finals. More clubs were formed after independence which includes Afghan FC Chaman and Wohaib. The first female club to be established was Diya W.F.C. in 2002.

Foundation of PFF
Football in Pakistan is as old as the country itself. Shortly after the creation of Pakistan in 1947, the Pakistan Football Federation (PFF) was created, and Muhammad Ali Jinnah became its first Patron-in-Chief. PFF received recognition from FIFA in early 1948. The annual National Championship was organized shortly after. In 1950, the national team gained their first international experience in Iran and Iraq. In 1954, the Pakistan National Team participated in the Asian Games at Manila and also toured the Far East. In 1958, Pakistan again took part in the Tokyo Asian Games. Pakistan also took part in the annual Asian Quadrangular Tournament. However, the game could not develop as smoothly as it should have. Pakistan's participation in international competitions has not been regular. The standard achieved in the early 1950s could not be maintained because of lack of organization of the game.

National teams
The Pakistan men's national football team and Pakistan women's national football team are members of the Asian Football Confederation, and its sub-confederation the South Asian Football Federation, as well as world governing board FIFA. National minifootball team is member of Asian Minifootball Confederation.

League system

Professional leagues

The Pakistan Premier League is the league for men's association football departments and clubs which in the Pakistan football league system, is the country's first tier professional football league. Contested by 12 departments and clubs, it operates on a system of promotion and relegation with the Football Federation League.

Cup competitions
The National Football Challenge Cup is an annual professional  football competition in men's domestic Pakistani football within the Pakistan football league system, deciding the competition winners through a round robin group stage to qualify for a single-legged knockout format, and a single leg final.

Academy
In January 2019, Atlético Madrid started Pakistan's first European football academy.

+40,000-capacity football stadiums in Pakistan

See also
 List of football stadiums in Pakistan
 India–Pakistan football rivalry

References

External links
Football Pakistan
Classic Football League 
Dawn, A history of football in Pakistan — Part I
Dawn, A history of football in Pakistan — Part II